Pala is a village in Türi Parish, Järva County in central Estonia.

Biologist and conservationist Jaan Eilart (1933–2006) was born in Pala village.

References

 

Villages in Järva County